State Highway 56 (SH 56) is a State Highway in Kerala, India that starts in Kanhangad and ends in Chemberi. The highway is 44.1 km long.

The Route Map 
Kanhangad – Eriya – Poodamkallu – Rajapuram – Kolichal - Panathoor - Chemberi

See also 
Roads in Kerala
List of State Highways in Kerala

References 

State Highways in Kerala
Roads in Kasaragod district